The Alexandroni Brigade (3rd Brigade) is an Israel Defense Forces brigade that has fought in multiple Israeli wars.

History
Along with the 7th Armoured Brigade both units had 139 killed during the first battle of Latrun (1948), Operation Ben Nun Alef. The commanding officer was Dan Even. 

Today the unit is a reserve unit.

Units
 31st Battalion
 32nd Battalion
 33rd Battalion
 34th Battalion
 37th Battalion

Katz controversy

In 1998, Teddy Katz wrote a master's thesis at Haifa University arguing that the Alexandroni Brigade committed a massacre in the Palestinian village of Tantura during the 1948 Arab–Israeli War. The veterans of the brigade sued Katz for libel. During the court hearing Katz conceded by issuing a statement withdrawing his own work. He then tried to withdraw his statement, but the court disallowed it and ruled against him.

A committee at Haifa University found problems with the thesis and ruled that it: "failed at the stage of presenting the raw material for the reader's judgment, both in terms of its organization according to strict criteria of classification and criticism, and in terms of the apparent instances of disregard for the interviewees' testimony". Some quotations in the thesis did not accord with interview recordings. The university suspended his degree and asked him to resubmit his thesis. The new thesis was rejected.

In 2004, Israeli historian Benny Morris reviewed the Tantura controversy. He suggests that, while controversy remains as to whether a "massacre" actually occurred, there is no doubt that war crimes were committed by the Jewish forces and that the village was forcibly cleansed of its Arab inhabitants. Morris underlined the fact that in interviews conducted by himself and by the whistle-blower Amil Gilat, all refugees confirmed that a massacre had taken place, while all IDF veterans denied it. Regarding the latter, Morris describes what he calls "troubling hints", such as a diary by an Alexandroni soldier, Tulik Makovsky, in which he wrote our boys know the craft of murder quite well, especially boys whose relatives the Arabs had murdered... or those harmed by Hitler. They took their private revenge, and avenged our comrades who had died at their hands, against the snipers. Morris defended the value of oral testimony and tradition. He additionally pointed out issues with the scoring of the second version of Katz's thesis in that the two referees who gave anomalously low scores had been co-authors of an IDF book in which it was argued that the Israeli Army had carried out only a "partial expulsion" of the populations of the Arab towns of Lydda and Ramlah, while the charge that the troops had massacred Lydda townspeople was dismissed.

In a 2021 Israeli documentary several veterans who engaged in the action admitted that numerous Palestinians had been gunned down.

Gallery

References

External links

 Official website 

1948 Arab–Israeli War
Brigades of Israel
Military units and formations established in 1948